Cristiano Machado (5 November 189326 December 1953) was a Brazilian politician.

Machado served as Mayor of Belo Horizonte between 1926 and 1929. He served as Congressman for Minas Gerais between 1945 and 1950, representing the Social Democratic Party (PSD). He was nominated as the PSD's candidate in the 1950 presidential election, but most members of the PSD supported the candidacy of Getúlio Vargas and he won only 21.49%.

He was named Brazilian ambassador to the Holy See in October 1953, but died shortly after taking office.

References 

1893 births
1953 deaths
People from Sabará
Social Democratic Party (Brazil, 1945–65) politicians
Members of the Chamber of Deputies (Brazil) from Minas Gerais
Mayors of Belo Horizonte
Candidates for President of Brazil